Sai Karthik is an Indian music composer, multi instrumentalist, and playback singer known for his works predominantly in Telugu cinema. Although he entered the film industry as a drummer for live shows, he soon turned film composer with the film Aboo Adavallu (2008). He also composed music for Pataas (2015). The 2019 film Tenali Ramakrishna BA. BL was his 75th as a music director.

Personal life and career 

At the age of nine, he played rhythm pads player in live shows, after he completed studies at age of 15 years. After he moved to Chennai, he worked under the supervision of music directors including like Vandematharam Srinivas, Koti, Mani Sharma, S. P. Balasubramanyam, Devi Sri Prasad, and R. P. Patnaik. He performed more than 3000 lives show as a drummer and pad player.

He then spent six and a half years under the tutelage of Mani Sharma and worked on live shows with him at the United States.

He began his career as a drummer and as a composer with the Telugu film Abbo Adavallu, while his first blockbuster Telugu film was Pataas in 2015. Raja Cheyi Vesthe in 2016 was Sai Kartheek 50th film as a music director.

Discography
Film scores and soundtracks

References

External links
 http://www.atozmp3.in/tag/sai-karthik

Indian male playback singers
Telugu film score composers
Telugu playback singers
Living people
1983 births
People from Ongole
Film musicians from Andhra Pradesh
Indian male composers
21st-century Indian composers
Male film score composers
21st-century Indian male singers
21st-century Indian singers